Robert McVicar (born January 15, 1982) is a Canadian former professional ice hockey goalie who played one game in the National Hockey League (NHL) for the Vancouver Canucks during the 2005–06 season. McVicar played major junior for the Brandon Wheat Kings of the Western Hockey League before being selected by the Canucks in the 2002 NHL Entry Draft. Turning professional in 2003 he played in the minor American Hockey League and ECHL before being called up and playing his lone NHL game on December 1, 2005 against the Edmonton Oilers, appearing for 3 minutes. He remained in the minor leagues for a further four seasons before retiring from hockey in 2009 and became a financial planner and stockbroker.

Playing career
Born in Hay River, Northwest Territories, McVicar moved to Brandon, Manitoba at the age of four. As his older brother Jason played goal, McVicar followed suit. A fan of the local Brandon Wheat Kings, a major junior team that played in the Western Hockey League, McVicar was selected by them in the 1997 bantam draft, and spent one year with the team's midget club. 

He played one season with the Trail Smoke Eaters of the British Columbia Hockey League before returning to Brandon, and spent his rookie season as the backup goalie. Offered a scholarship to the University of Maine, McVicar went there in 2000, but was ruled ineligible by the NCAA so returned to Brandon in November that year. With three goalies on the team, McVicar played limited minutes in the season, but was named the starter for the 2001–02 season. After the season ended he was selected 151st overall by the Vancouver Canucks in the 2002 NHL Entry Draft, though McVicar remained with Brandon for one final year before turning professional. 

For most of three seasons, from 2003-2004 to 2005-2006, McVicar played in the AHL for the Manitoba Moose; with the exception of 19 games played in the ECHL with the Columbia Inferno during the 2003-2004 season; 33 games played in the ECHL with the Victoria Salmon Kings during the 2005-2006 season; and one game played in the NHL with the Vancouver Canucks during the 2005–2006 season. In McVicar's only NHL appearance, on December 1, 2005 against the Edmonton Oilers, he played 3 minutes without facing a shot. 

During the 2006–07 season, McVicar played in the ECHL with the Utah Grizzlies, and during the 2007-2008 season he played in the CHL with the Arizona Sundogs. He signed with Totempo HvIK for the 2008–09 season. His last season was spent in Germany.

Post-playing career
After retiring from hockey, McVicar moved to Regina, Saskatchewan with his wife Laurie and two children. He took up a position as a certified financial planner and stockbroker with Edward Jones Investments.

Career statistics

Regular season and playoffs

See also
List of players who played only one game in the NHL

References

External links

1982 births
Living people
Arizona Sundogs players
Brandon Wheat Kings players
Canadian expatriate ice hockey players in the United States
Canadian ice hockey goaltenders
Columbia Inferno players
Elmira Jackals (ECHL) players
Ice hockey people from Manitoba
Ice hockey people from the Northwest Territories
Manitoba Moose players
People from Hay River
Sportspeople from Brandon, Manitoba
Utah Grizzlies (ECHL) players
Vancouver Canucks draft picks
Vancouver Canucks players
Victoria Salmon Kings players